Clara Adams (born Clara Grabau; 1884 – 1971), known as the "first flighter" and the "maiden of maiden flights," was an aircraft passenger and enthusiast who set a variety of flying records. She helped popularize air travel and was the first woman to fly across the Atlantic as a passenger aboard the Graf Zeppelin.

Personal life 
Adams was born in 1884 in Cincinnati, Ohio to German parents as Clara Grabau. She later studied music in Leipzig.

Adams was married to George Adams, who was affluent and served as president of the American Leather Tanning Company.

Flying 
In March 1914, Adams embarked on her first flight in Florida on a Thomas flying boat. The flight was piloted by Walter E. Johnson, who would become a captain in the U.S. Army, and reached an altitude of 700 feet, "a daring height in those pioneer days." The flight would spark her interest in aviation.

She was the first passenger on round-trip commercial flights across the Pacific, between New York and Bermuda, and between San Francisco and New Zealand.  She is remembered primarily as the first woman to fly across the Atlantic as a ticketed passenger aboard the Graf Zeppelin on its return flight from New York in October 1928. The journalist Grace Marguerite Hay Drummond-Hay flew across the Atlantic, on the outbound flight of the same journey. Adams also was the first woman to fly aboard the Dornier Do X between New York and Rio de Janeiro and she was one of 11 women aboard the maiden flight of the Hindenburg. Despite the end of public interest in airships due to the Hindenburg disaster, Adams remained eager to fly on airships.

In 1939, Adams set the unofficial record for passenger travel around the world via commercial air travel. The trip lasted sixteen days and nineteen hours and covered 24,609 miles.  She departed from New York on the first flight of the Dixie Clipper across the Atlantic.  According to a New York Times reporter, she returned to Newark, NJ, "clad in a tan-plaid tailored suit, made of Chinese silk, purchased in Hong Kong, and wearing a tan Panama straw hat, purchased in Rangoon."  She described the journey around the globe as "beautiful beyond description and sublime beyond the most vivid imagination of the human mind."

Legacy 
Although Adams was not a pilot, her activities did much to popularize air travel.  According to Adams, her journey around the world had demonstrated that air travel was "perfectly safe."  She corresponded with the famous female pilot Alys McKey Bryant.  The historian Tom Friedman described Adams as "the Forrest Gump of aviation history."

References

External links
 Clara Adams photographs and biography
 Clara Adams Takes Flight from Engines of our Ingenuity

Archival holdings 
The following collections contain documents or photographs relating to Clara Adams:
 Alys McKey Bryant Papers at Wichita State University.
 Other Collections – OTH 5:1-3 Box 4 at Liberty University.
 Photograph "First Paying Passengers of the Pan American Hawaii Clipper" at Hawaii State Archives.
 Photograph "First Paying Passengers of the Pan American Hawaii Clipper" at Hawaii State Archives.

1884 births
1971 deaths
American people of German descent
People from Cincinnati
Aviators from Ohio
American aviation record holders
American women aviation record holders
LZ 127 Graf Zeppelin